Emilian Metu (born 18 April 2003) is an Austrian professional footballer who plays as a midfielder for Austrian Bundesliga club Austria Klagenfurt, on loan from Bayern Munich II.

Club career
Metu spent his youth career with local team Haidbrunn-Wacker Wiener Neustadt and AKA St. Pölten. In September 2020, Austrian Bundesliga club St. Pölten announced the signing of Metu on a two year deal with option to extend for a further year. He initially played for club's reserve side in 1. Niederösterreichische Landesliga – fourth tier of Austrian football league system. He made his professional debut on 10 February 2021 in a 1–3 league defeat against LASK. This made him second youngest Bundesliga player in club history, only behind Markus Siedl.

On 2 March 2021, Bayern Munich announced that Metu have signed a contract with the club until June 2025. He is initially planned for the reserve side and will join the club ahead of 2021–2022 season.

International career
Metu was born in Austria to a Nigerian father and Austrian mother. He is a current Austrian youth international.

Career statistics

Club

References

External links
 

2003 births
Living people
Association football midfielders
Austrian footballers
Austria youth international footballers
Austrian people of Nigerian descent
Austrian Football Bundesliga players
SKN St. Pölten players
FC Bayern Munich II players
Austrian expatriate footballers
Austrian expatriate sportspeople in Germany
Expatriate footballers in Germany